Lastikman is a Philippine action dramedy fantaserye based on Mars Ravelo's comic book character of the same name. The show initially aired on ABS-CBN from September 24, 2007, to January 25, 2008, replacing Margarita. and was replaced by Kung Fu Kids. Vhong Navarro played the title role. The story follows Miguel (Vhong Navarro) who transforms into a superhero who came from another planet.

Lastikman received the highest average rating (36.4%) for a Philippine television series in 2008 according to NUTAM.

Plot

Prologue: The Adventure Begins
Amon Labao, the matriarch of the planet Igbao in the galaxy Harraio, orders her subjects to conduct extensive experiments upon humans, their first being the abducted Ruth Abelgas. However, one scientist, Irroian, aids in her escape, and the pair fall in love, leading to Ruth giving birth to Eskappar.

When the Council determines that Ruth must be executed, Irroian seeks the help of his friend Agaddon in returning her to Earth, but a Council spy named Maraam learns that Ruth is with Irroian and arrests him. Meanwhile, Agaddon escapes with Ruth to Earth, and is determined by the Council to be the "actual" traitor.

Once released, Irroian continues to raise Eskappar in Harraio, but because Eskappar assumes human form, Irroian eventually attempts to escape with him to Earth for fear for his son's life. Irroian is shot by Maraam's guards during the attempt, but he manages to send Eskappar to Earth with Butao, a robot containing a recording of Irroian with instructions for Eskappar to search for Ruth.

After Eskappar lands on Earth, he sees a man, Caloy, and follows him. However, when Caloy falls into a surging river, Eskappar uses his elasticity to save Caloy's life. Caloy eventually assumes that Eskappar is a lost foreigner, and takes him home, where he names him "Miguel" and raises him. Several years later, Miguel witnesses the death of his foster father, and decides to become Lastikman.

Chapter 1: Mothra
Susan Navarro, an ex-beauty queen and interior decorator, is kidnapped by Agaddon and transformed into "Mothra," a moth-like monster that spreads respiratory illnesses and manipulates men. She later appears in a park, where she infects passersby and kills them. A photographer named Albert chances upon the scene and is left alive by Mothra to spread the story of the virus outbreak. Later that evening, Susan's mother recognizes her as Mothra from a photograph in a newspaper and wonders if this is a punishment for her relationship with Danny. At the same time, Evilone Pharmaceutical offers to find a cure for Mothra's victims.

Meanwhile, Miguel is depressed because Yellena is planning to reconcile with Ken. He avoids his friends and takes a day off to take his mind off Yellena. When his friends check on him that evening, Miguel announces that he wants to drop out of school. However, his friends dissuade him from his rash decision. The next day, Miguel returns to school and is again attracted to Yellena. Though Yellena is still intent on reconciling with Ken, he is busy practicing sports, and Miguel sees the situation as an opportunity to be close to Yellena by consoling her.

Chapter 2: Beautiki/Byutiki
Ines Samantela, a teacher at POPU college, is found by Agaddon and voluntarily transformed into "Beautiki (Byutiki)", a lizard-like creature that can use acid to melt her victims away. She uses her new-found power to destroy those who she believed had hurt her, including one of her relatives.

Chapter 3: Alingasaw
A paparazzo named Albert Langitan is tasked to tail Lastikman and secretly photograph him. However, he is found by Agaddon and transformed into "Alingasaw", manipulator of insects and worms.

Chapter 4: Morphino
Mang Ninoy, a sari-sari store owner in Bgy. Bagong Unlad, is found by Agaddon and talked into being transformed into "Morphino". He can transform to resemble others, and uses this ability to impersonate and discredit Lastikman.

Chapter 5: Lagablab
Ryan White, Yellena's older brother, was angry at Miguel, blaming him for her death and his mother Ayessa's stroke. Jared convinced him to turn into "Lagablab", controller of fire. Jared had also turned the rest of the Foremen into Ryan's minions to destroy Lastikman. Still, Lastikman managed to defeat the Foremen. Infuriated, Jared had other plans in mind in order to acquire his ultimate soldier.

Chapter 6: Frosta
After witnessing the murder of her son Ryan in Lastikman's hands, the half-dead Ayessa White allowed herself to be under Jared's command. Jared turns her into a manipulator of ice and heals her paralysis. She calls herself "Frosta".

Chapter 7: Elemento
Because his stone, Liwata, was completed, Jared Evilone was able to use it to unlock the powers of fire, wind, earth, and water. He turns into "Elemento", master of the elements, in order to battle Lastikman for Ruth's attention and love as well as to finish his empire's completion.

He was weakened upon the removal of his completed stone, Liwata, but as he was left for dead, Toto listened to his instructions and brought about Elemento's final transformation.

Cast

Main cast
Vhong Navarro as Eskappar/Miguel "Migz" Asis/Lastikman: a half-human, half-alien superhero who possesses the ability to stretch and distort his body, and takes his alias from the word "elastic". Coming from the extragalactic planet Igbao, he was originally named "Eskappar" by his parents, and was given the name Miguel when he came to Earth. Lastikman spends much of the series fighting against monsters created by Agaddon while searching for his mother, Ruth.

Supporting cast
Gloria Romero as Amon Labao: the leader in Harraio Galaxy
Iya Villania as Yellena White: Miguel's best friend and love interest
Cherie Gil as Ayessa White/Frosta: Yellena's mother
Dawn Zulueta as Ruth Abelgas: an Earthling abducted to planet Igbao and Miguel/Eskappar's mother
Zsa Zsa Padilla as Cynthia "Cindy" Evilone: the alter ego of Ruth
Ian Veneracion as Agaddon: a Harrian scientist and Lastikman's nemesis
John Estrada as Dr. Jared Evilone/Elemento: the alter ego of Agaddon
Roxanne Guinoo as Cassandra "Sandy" Evilone: Jared and Cynthia's daughter
Danilo Barrios as Ryan White/Lagablab: Yellena's older brother and Ayessa's son 
Jake Cuenca as Kenneth "Ken" Madrigal: the leader of the Foremen group
Jomari Yllana as Mang Ninoy/Morphino: a sari-sari store owner in Bgy. Bagong Unlad
Carmi Martin as Dolores Puntawe: Miguel's foster mother
Tonton Gutierrez as Irroian: a Harrian scientist and Miguel/Eskappar's father
Sunshine Cruz as Susan Navarro/Mothra: an ex-beauty queen and interior decorator

Extended cast
Archie Alemania as Chikoy Gipit: Miguel's neighbor and good friend
Empress Schuck as Madonna Puntawe: Dolores' daughter out of wedlock and Miguel's foster sister
Jason Gainza as Carlos "Caloy" Asis: Miguel's foster father
James Blanco as Albert Langitan/Alingasaw: a photographer tasked with taking photos of Lastikman
Enchong Dee as Rafael "Raffy" Gipit: Chikoy's geeky younger brother and Madonna's love interest
Saicy Aguila as Ines Samantela/Beautiki: a teacher at POPU college
Jairus Aquino as Young Eskappar/Miguel
Alex Cortez as Maaram

Guest cast

Toni Gonzaga as Gemma Dela Rosa - TV News Reporter
Issa Pressman (credited as Louissa Pressman) as young Yellena
Jairus Aquino as young Miguel/Eskappar
John Prats as young adult Miguel/Eskappar
Jacob Dionisio as young Chikoy
Sophia Baars as young Sandy
Andrew Muhlach as young Ryan
Carlo Lacana as young Ken
Paulo Sadist as Reden
Claire Vanessa Lim as Kim An Yoong
CJ Jaravata as Eva
Peewee O'Hara as Aling Mathod
Gilette Sandico as Judith
Georgia Ortega as Choleng
Basty Alcanses as Cyruss
Eva Darren as Susan's Mother
Marvin Raymundo as Don
Jordan Castillo as Toto: Agaddon/Jared Evilone's trusted assistant
Nonie Buencamino as Danny
Paolo Ramirez as Jerson
Niña Dolino as Jane
Kimberly Diaz as Susana

Production

Lastikman OST
The main theme song is called "Lastikman". It is performed by Parokya ni Edgar and can be found on their album, Solid. The love theme is called "Maging Anupaman Para Sa'yo" (I'll Be Anything For You) performed by Martin Nievera for Miguel & Yellena (Vhong & Iya).

Primer
A primer was made entitled, Lastikmania: The Making of Lastikman. It was aired on September 22, 2007. It was hosted by Piolo Pascual, Bea Alonzo, Anne Curtis, and John Lloyd Cruz. ABS-CBN also made a teaser program entitled, Lastikminutes. It showed how Lastikman was created and conceptualized. It was aired a week before the show kicked off on Primetime Bida.

Reception
Lastikman debuted with 30.3% according to AGB Nielsen in Mega Manila. The highest ratings it garnered was 30.9%, while the lowest was the New Year's Eve episode, which only got 15.1%. The final episode garnered a 41.4% Nationwide rating.

Lastikman will be also part of Komiks Presents: Isang Lakas. Together with Mars Ravelo's different comic characters, like Kapitan Boom, Varga, Tiny Tony, Dragonna and Flash Bomba.

Awards
The said TV series won Silver World Medal (Action/ Adventure category) from the prestigious 2009 New York Festivals.

See also
Isang Lakas
List of programs aired by ABS-CBN
List of dramas of ABS-CBN
Lastikman
Lastikman: Unang Banat
Lastikman (2003 film)

References

External links

Lastikman
2007 Philippine television series debuts
2008 Philippine television series endings
ABS-CBN drama series
Fantaserye and telefantasya
Filipino-language television shows
Philippine action television series
Superhero television series
Television shows based on comics
Television series by Dreamscape Entertainment Television
Television shows set in the Philippines